Ronan Michael (born 3 July 2000) is an Irish professional rugby league footballer who plays as a  for the York Knights in the Championship and Ireland at international level.

He previously played for the Huddersfield Giants in the Super League, and spent time on loan from Huddersfield at Whitehaven, York and the Swinton Lions.

Background
Born in Balbriggan to a Canadian-Irish mother and a Caribbean father, Michael grew up playing rugby union.

Playing career

Huddersfield Giants
Michael signed an academy contract with the Huddersfield Giants for the 2019 season.

Michael moved to Australia in January 2020 to play for the Canberra Raiders in their Jersey Flegg Cup team (under-20s). He remained contracted to Huddersfield for 2021. He did not play any competition matches for Canberra as the season was cancelled due to the COVID-19 pandemic. He returned home in March 2020.

Michael was named to make his Super League debut for the Huddersfield Giants against the Wigan Warriors in round 20 of the 2020 Super League season. He was the first Irish-born player to play in the Super League since Brian Carney in 2009.

Whitehaven (loan)
On 29 April 2021 it was reported that he had signed for Whitehaven in the RFL Championship on loan.

Swinton Lions (loan)
On 27 May 2021 it was reported that he had signed for Swinton Lions in the RFL Championship on a short-term loan. After the initial short-term loan had ended, it was later reported on 22 July 2021 that he had returned to Swinton for the remainder of the 2021 season.

York RLFC
On 3 October 2022 it was reported that he had signed for York RLFC on a two-year deal after having spent the previous season on loan with the club.

References

External links
Euro Rugby League u19s profile
Ireland profile

2000 births
Living people
Irish people of Canadian descent
Irish people of Antigua and Barbuda descent
Ireland national rugby league team players
Irish rugby league players
Huddersfield Giants players
Rugby league props
Rugby league centres
Rugby league players from County Dublin
Swinton Lions players
Whitehaven R.L.F.C. players
York City Knights players